It's OK! is a musical group formed by Redd Kross members Robert Hecker (guitar, vocals) and Victor Indrizzo (drums), along with bassist Abby Travis and the late Greg White on vocals. This initial line up of the band released the self-titled debut album It's OK!.

The line up of Robert Hecker (guitar, vocals), Dave Naz (drums), Ellen Rooney (vocals, factotum), and Matt Smith (bass, vocals) recorded the second It's OK! album, Dream.

The current line-up of the band consists of Robert Hecker (guitar, vocals), Ellen Rooney (vocals, factotum), Dennis McGarry (bass, vocals), and Joey Mancaruso (drums, vocals). It's OK! were signed by Exene Cervenka of X to Moonlight Graham Records.; however, It's OK!'s third album, Cubed, was released on Econoclast Recordings. The quartet's fourth release is aptly titled 4. 

It's OK! toured California, Oregon, and Washington with Frightwig in June, 2014.

Discography
 It's OK! 
 Dream 
 Cubed
 4

References

External links
It's OK! official website

It's OK
American rock music groups